Trismelasmos albicans is a moth in the family Cossidae. It was described by Roepke in 1955. It is found in New Guinea.

References

Zeuzerinae
Moths described in 1955